Mohammad Azhar bin Sairudin (born 30 September 1986) is a Singapore professional footballer who currently plays as an attacking midfielder for S.League club Geylang International and the Singapore national football team.

International career 
On 28 May 2016, Azhar was called up to represent the Singapore national football team for the 2016 AYA Bank Cup. It was Azhar's first call-up to the national team, after former Singapore national team coach Bernd Stange was replaced by his assistant V. Sundramoorthy. On 3 June 2016, Azhar made his senior international debut against Myanmar in the 2016 AYA Bank Cup, playing 60 minutes before being substituted for Yasir Hanapi. The international cup fixture eventually ended in a 1–0 win for Singapore.

Career statistics

Club

International

Honours 
 Singapore League Cup
 Winner: 2009
 Runner-up: 2011
 Singapore Cup
 Runner-up: 2015
 S.League Player of the Month (1)
 August 2015

Personal life 
Azhar is the eldest child in his family, with a total of seven other siblings. In 2015, Azhar's younger sibling, Aqil Sairudin, died in a motorcycle accident on the Seletar Expressway in Singapore. Another sibling of Azhar, Azreen Sairudin, suffered multiple injuries from the accident as well, but subsequently recovered. During that period of time, Azhar went on a hiatus from his professional footballing career, with the assistance of his football club Home United.

References

External links 
 

1986 births
Living people
Singaporean footballers
Singapore international footballers
Association football midfielders
Home United FC players
Hougang United FC players
Singapore Premier League players
Singaporean people of Malay descent